Andrew Guenther (born 1976 in Wheaton, Illinois) is an American artist based in Brooklyn, New York. He received his BFA from Lawrence University in 1998 and his MFA from Rutgers University in 2000. His works have been widely exhibited in the United States, Europe, and Asia.

Guenther creates paintings, sculptures, and photographs. His works often combine elements of painting and sculpture, incorporating items such as underwear, T-shirts, sunglasses, and cigars into his paintings. His recent work has featured papier-mâché, as well as gold and silver leaf. Guenther's early work, which drew comparisons to painters such as Francisco Goya and Hieronymous Bosch, referenced death metal, zombies, satyrs, and hippie kitsch. These paintings have been described as “iconoclastic, demented and decadent.”  His more recent paintings have focused on a recurring “Plate Face” character, along with whales, dolphins, and more abstract concerns. They have been described as evocative of Abstract Expressionism and outsider art.

In his photography, Guenther often works in black and white. That is, in part, because of what he views as its documentary aspect. Guenther says it helps to, "free his images from the clutter of unintended cultural references."

Solo exhibitions
2014
"Popcorn Illusions," 106 Green, Brooklyn, NY

2011
“Talking to a Fish and Paraphernalia,”] Freight + Volume, New York
“Corn, Tobacco, and Other Stories,” Kaycee Olsen Gallery, Los Angeles
 
2010
“The Devil’s Pants," Motus Fort, Tokyo
"Recent Works on Paper," Freight + Volume, New York

2008
“Looking For Culture: Part I," Andrew Rafacz Gallery, Chicago
“Looking For Culture: Part III,” Freight + Volume, New York

2007
“Things Ingested and the Shapes They Become,” Derek Eller Gallery, New York
"Standing in water up to the shins, your foot looks at a minnow and says, 'look what I have become!',"] David Castillo, Miami
"The Slap of Bird Shit on Wet Pavement," Mogadishni, Copenhagen

2006
“Reflections of Ourselves From Space,” Bucket Rider Gallery, Chicago

2005
“Us and Them,” Greener Pastures Gallery Contemporary Art, Toronto

2004
“Something Happened Yesterday and More Things Will Happen Tomorrow,” Perry Rubenstein Gallery, New York

2003
“How Do You Waste Your Time,” Daniel Silverstein Gallery, New York

2002
“Somewhere Between Good and Evil,” Daniel Silverstein Gallery, New York

Selected bibliography
Books and Catalogues
2012
Bua, Matt, and Maximilian Goldfarb, eds., Architectural Inventions: Visionary Drawing of Buildings. (London: Laurence King Publishing Ltd., 2012).

2008
Mullins, Charlotte, ed., Painting People: Figure Painting Today. (New York: Distributed Art Publishers, 2008).

2005
The Triumph of Painting. (London: Jonathan Cape, 2005).

Articles
2012
Landes, Jennifer. "The Art Scene: 09.13.12." The East Hampton Star, September 11, 2012. Accessed January 28, 2013. http://www.easthamptonstar.com/?q=Arts/2012911/Art-Scene-091312

2006
Grabner, Michelle. "Andrew Guenther, Bucket Rider Gallery." Artforum, November 2006.

2005
Comer-Greene, Rachel. "Sticks & Stones."  Time Out New York, August 11–17, 2005.
"'You are Here' charts critical look at artistic frontier."  The Big Bend Sentinel, October 6, 2005.

2004
"Mixed Paint: A Survey of Contemporary Painters." Flash Art, November–December 2004.

References

External links
Flash Art Online Studio Visit interview by Andrea Bellini 
Featured Artist, Dossier Journal 
Andrew Guenther's website

1976 births
Living people
20th-century American painters
American male painters
21st-century American painters
21st-century American male artists
American contemporary painters
Rutgers University alumni
20th-century American male artists